Comitas onokeana is a species of sea snail, a marine gastropod mollusc in the family Pseudomelatomidae, the turrids and allies. Comitas onokeana has a subspecies called Comitas onokeana vivens.Dell, 1956

Description
The length of the shell attains 30 mm, its diameter 12 mm.

Distribution
This marine species is endemic to New Zealand. Fossils have been found in Tertiary strata of southern Wairarapa

References

 King, L. C. "Tertiary molluscan faunas from the southern Wairarapa." Transactions of the New Zealand Institute. Vol. 63. 1933.
 Maxwell, P.A. (2009). Cenozoic Mollusca. pp 232–254 in Gordon, D.P. (ed.) New Zealand inventory of biodiversity. Volume one. Kingdom Animalia: Radiata, Lophotrochozoa, Deuterostomia. Canterbury University Press, Christchurch. 
 Powell, A.W.B. 1979: New Zealand Mollusca: Marine, Land and Freshwater Shells, Collins, Auckland

External links
 
 
 Auckland Museum: Comitas onokeana

onokeana
Gastropods described in 1933
Gastropods of New Zealand